Edmundston  is a city in Madawaska County, New Brunswick, Canada.

On 1 January 2023, Edmundston amalgamated with the village of Rivière-Verte and parts of two local service districts; revised census figures have not been released.

History

During the early colonial period, the area was a camping and meeting place of the Maliseet (Wolastoqiyik) Nation during seasonal migrations. From the mid to late eighteenth century, one of the largest Maliseet villages had been established at Madawaska and had become a refuge site for other Wabanaki peoples. The Maliseet village was originally located near the falls at the confluence of the Madawaska and Saint John Rivers. Currently, the City of Edmundston surrounds a federal Indian Reserve (St. Basile 10/Madawaska Maliseet First Nation). Originally named Petit-Sault (Little Falls) in reference to the waterfalls located where the Madawaska River merges into the Saint John River, the settlement was renamed Edmundston in 1851 after Sir Edmund Walker Head, who was Lieutenant-Governor of New Brunswick from 1848 to 1854 and Governor-General of Canada from 1854 to 1861. Originally a small logging settlement, Edmundston's growth is mostly attributed to the city's strategic location.

Aroostook War and the "Republic of Madawaska"

The area was at the centre of the Aroostook War of 1839, a skirmish over boundary lines between the U.S.A. and what was then British North America. Originally confined to a disagreement between the State of Maine and the Colony of New Brunswick, the dispute eventually spread to involve the Government of the United States in Washington, D.C. and the British Colonial Administration in Quebec City, seat of the Governor General of Canada, who had supreme authority over all of British North America, including New Brunswick. In the wake of this international conflict, a small fortification (Fortin du Petit-Sault) was built in anticipation of a possible attack by the Americans, to complement the much larger fortification located at Fort Ingall (now Cabano) in nearby Canada (now Quebec). One of the central figures at the origin of the conflict was American-born industrialist "Colonel" John Baker, who had established sawmills and other lumber-related industries on the eastern shores of the Saint John river, an area claimed by the British that Baker wanted to be declared part of Maine as he was a fiercely nationalist American.

When the terms of the treaty that was signed following the conflict left Baker's properties firmly planted on British soil, and with the lack of support from the US Government to oppose the decision, Baker was facing the dilemma of either moving his facilities across the river on the American side, or to accept British sovereignty. Unwilling to do either, he declared the area an independent state called the "Republic of Madawaska," declaring himself head of state with the overwhelming support of the local, mostly French-speaking but independent-minded population. The "Republic" was never recognized and never had legal existence, but nevertheless the concept has remained so popular with the francophone Brayon residents on both the Canadian and American sides of the border that they refer to the region as the Republic of Madawaska to this day, and each mayor of Edmundston still receives the title of "President of the Republic of Madawaska." Baker's wife, Sophie Rice, designed the Republic's "eagle" flag that is still in use and a common sight in the area.

Amalgamation
In 1998, Edmundston, Saint-Basile, Saint-Jacques and Verret merged to form the City of Edmundston. In 2023 Edmundston expanded again to include Rivière-Verte and parts of adjacent local service districts.

Geography

Edmundston is located at the edge of the New Brunswick "panhandle," nestled in the northeastern section of the Appalachian Mountains at the junction of the Saint John and Madawaska Rivers in the northwestern part of the province.

Edmundston is strategically situated only a few kilometres from the border with Quebec and on the border with the United States, opposite the town of Madawaska, Maine, to which it is connected by the Edmundston–Madawaska Bridge.

Demographics

Mother tongue language (2006)

Religious make-up (2001)

The median household income in 2005 for Edmundston was $42,551, which is below the New Brunswick provincial average of $45,194.

The city is 95 per cent francophone, the highest such proportion of all cities in the province. Edmundston is the third-largest predominantly francophone city in North America outside of Quebec and the Caribbean, behind Clarence-Rockland, Ontario, which has a population exceeding 20,000 and is 68 per cent francophone, and Dieppe, which has a population of 25,384 (2016 Census) and is roughly 80 percent francophone. Outside of Quebec, the cities of Ottawa (122,665), Sudbury (45,420), Toronto (34,900), Winnipeg (26,855), Moncton (20,425), Timmins (17,390) and Edmonton (15,715) have greater total numbers of francophones, but they are a minority group in those cities.

Unlike most other francophones living in the Maritimes, most people living in the Edmundston area do not consider themselves Acadians other than for statistical purposes. Most of them descend from French-Canadians who originally came from Lower Canada (now Quebec) along with a few Irish immigrants to settle the area in the century between 1820 and 1920, and absorbed the small group of Acadians who had arrived earlier. Nor do they consider themselves Québécois despite their heritage, mainly due to the politicization of Quebec-specific issues they do not feel concerned with. Residents speak with a distinctive local accent, colloquially called "l'accent brayon".

Religion

Christianity is the dominant religion of the city's inhabitants, with most residents being Roman Catholics. Moreover, Edmundston gives its name to the episcopal see of the region. Edmundston covers four Catholic parishes. Protestant denominations established in city include the Anglican Church of Canada, the United Church of Canada, the United Pentecostal Church International and a French Christian Church called Église de l'Espoir d'Edmundston. A small number  of Muslims live in Edmundston and the surrounding area, practicing in their own community centre.

Climate

Edmundston experiences a humid continental climate (Köppen climate classification Dfb).

Economy

Edmundston is a rural town whose economy centres on the Saint John River paper industry. The river historically provided water power for the mills and was the route of log drives bringing pulpwood from upstream forests. The river still provides the water supply for paper manufacture, but environmental concerns encourage pulpwood delivery by highway and rail.

Forestry is one of the city's major industries, with several sawmills and paper plants in the vicinity, the largest being the Twin Rivers pulp mill, formerly owned by Fraser Papers, now owned by Norbord, by way of Noranda Forest (1998) and Nexfor (2004). The Edmundston pulp mill is paired with a Twin Rivers paper mill directly across the Saint John River in Madawaska, Maine, through which liquified pulp slurry is piped.  The pulp is shipped across the border through a mile-long high pressure pipeline running between both facilities, and is made into paper in Madawaska. The Madawaska mill specializes in fine-grade papers. The town's economy is highly dependent upon cross-border trade, to the extent that Edmundston and its smaller sister city of Madawaska are considered by residents under many aspects, a single economic entity.

An illuminated sign and plastics manufacture owned by Pattison Sign is also important to the city's economy. IPL, a company that manufactures plastic eating utensils, has a facility in Edmundston.

The city is the site of the regional hospital for the area. There is a campus of the French language University of Moncton in Edmundston. The New Brunswick Community college system has a campus in Edmundston.

Arts and culture
Every June, Edmundston plays host to the Festival Jazz et Blues d'Edmundston (The Edmundston Jazz and Blues Festival).

Every year in August, there is a large cultural festival in Edmundston called the Foire Brayonne. The festival is one of the biggest French themed festivals held in Canada east of the province of Quebec.

The three manual Casavant neo-baroque mechanical action pipe organ of the Church of Notre-Dame-des-Sept-Douleurs, situated in a hall with a superb live acoustic, is one of the finest pipe organs in Canada.

Attractions

Edmundston hosts two provincial historical sites:
 Cathedral of Immaculate Conception: Built in 1924, the cathedral's architecture is said to be a synthesis of Roman and Gothic styles. Its granite facade has been recently restored, and can accommodate more than 1,200 people.
 Fortin du Petit-Sault: Erected at the culmination of the boundary disputes between the United States of America and British North America (an international conflict known as Aroostook War) in 1841 prior to the signing of the Webster-Ashburton Treaty. This small fort was rebuilt in 2000.

Other tourist attractions include de la République Provincial Park, an 18-hole golf course, a pedestrian downtown with a number of retail stores, restaurants, a hotel and a convention centre. You can also visit the Antique Automobile Museum, the Madawaska Historic Museum, and many other museums.

The New Brunswick Botanical Garden is in suburban Saint-Jacques, on seven hectares with more than 80,000 plants, making it the largest arboretum east of Montreal. 

Edmundston has a downhill skiing facility in the city at Mont Farlagne. This facility has 3 lifts, a t-bar, a double chair, and a quad chair. It has 14 trails and an elevation of 690 feet. Snowmaking is available. Five trails are lit for night skiing.

Sports
Since 2017, Edmundston has been home to the Edmundston Blizzard of the Maritime Junior A Hockey League, playing their home games at the Centre Jean Daigle.

Government
The offices of the Member of Parliament for the federal riding of Madawaska—Restigouche René Arseneault and the Member of the Legislative Assembly for the provincial riding of Edmundston-Madawaska Centre (Jean-Claude D'Amours) are located in downtown Edmundston and for the provincial riding of Madawaska Les Lacs-Edmundston (Francine Landry) are located in Edmundston.

Transportation infrastructure
Edmundston is served by New Brunswick Route 2, a four-lane all weather divided highway and, on the other side of the Saint John River, by U.S. Route 1. There is a municipal airport 17 kilometres north of Edmundston which serves general aviation traffic. The Trans Canada Trail passes through Edmundston, having been converted for pedestrian and bicycling use after abandonment of the New Brunswick Railway.

Education
The city has two francophone K-8 schools, an anglophone K-12 school, a francophone high school, a community college campus affiliated with the Collège communautaire du Nouveau-Brunswick, and a university campus affiliated with the Université de Moncton.

Media

Edmundston is served by five newspapers: Le Madawaska, L'Étoile — Édition La République, L'Acadie Nouvelle, The Telegraph Journal and Info Weekend), two local radio stations (CJEM-FM, CFAI-FM), two television rebroadcasters (CFTF-DT-1, CIMT-DT-1) and a regional bureau of Radio-Canada.

The area also receives the Quebec City-based newspapers Le Journal de Québec and Le Soleil which will cover notable events in the region.

Notable people

See also
List of communities in New Brunswick
List of paper mills

References

External links

 
Cities in New Brunswick
Populated places established in 1850
New Brunswick populated places on the Saint John River (Bay of Fundy)